The 1020s BC is a decade which lasted from 1029 BC to 1020 BC.

Events and trends
 1027 BC — Traditional date for the end of the Shang Dynasty in China, and the beginning of the Zhou Dynasty.
 1026 BC — Saul the King becomes the first king of the Israelites.
 c. 1025 BC — Collapse of Mycenaean dominance ends.
 c. 1020 BC — destruction of Troy.

Births
 1027 BC - Zhao of Zhou